Biola Adebayo is a Nollywood actress, producer starring in Jade's cross, Tori Owo and other films. She hosted the 2nd edition of bling award alongside Woli Agba in Ibadan themed "Take a flight with us". The actress create awareness to combat coronavirus together with Eniola Badmus and Banky W during the pandemic by encouraging people to stay indoor and use sanitizers.

Early life and education 
She hawked just to make ends meet and struggled right from secondary to university days. She had her master's degree in Public Administration at University of Lagos.

Personal life 
She married Oluseyi on 7 April 2021 and assured fans of managing her home regardless of their flaws and differences.

Awards 
The Nollywood actress won the Best supporting actress BON award, 2020. She also won the face of Nollywood at City people award and Best supporting actress, DIYMA award both in 2021.

Filmography 

 Tori oro
 Ike Kefa
 Omo Abore
 Jade's cross

References 

Nigerian film actresses
Yoruba actresses
Actresses in Yoruba cinema
Nigerian film producers
Nigerian television presenters
Nigerian women film producers
University of Lagos alumni
Nigerian television personalities
21st-century Nigerian actresses
Year of birth missing (living people)
Living people